Robert Kenneth Willis II (born October 6, 1966) is a former American football placekicker in the National Football League (NFL) for the Dallas Cowboys, Tampa Bay Buccaneers, and New York Giants. He played college football at the University of Kentucky.

Early years
Willis attended Owensboro High School, where he was a kicker and punter. He was a teammate of future  NFL player Mark Higgs. He received All-region honors as a senior.

He also lettered in baseball and soccer. He was named All-conference in baseball as a senior.

College career
Willis moved on to play for Centre College, where he was the team's kicker and punter. He transferred to the University of Kentucky at the end of his first year. 

In 1986, he was redshirted. As a sophomore, he handled all of the team's kickoffs. The next season, he earned the placekicker starting job. 

As a senior, he registered a 77.3% average (17 of 22) on field goal attempts, good for third in school history. He also set the school mark for points in a game (15) and tied the school record for field goals in a game (4). 

He left as the school's most accurate kicker with a 70.8% average (29 of 41) on field goals. He also made 29 field goals (second in school history) and had an 89% average (34 of 38) on extra points.

A Math major, he received Academic All-SEC honors three years in a row.

Professional career

Dallas Cowboys
Willis was signed as an undrafted free agent by the Dallas Cowboys after the 1990 NFL Draft. He earned the starting job over Luis Zendejas in preseason, becoming the first rookie to kick for the club since Efren Herrera in 1974. He set a franchise record for points by a rookie (80), surpassing the previous  mark of 78 points held by Bob Hayes and Tony Dorsett. He finished seventh in the NFL with an 86% average (18-of-21) on field goals.

In 1991, he tied franchise records with 9 straight field goals, 27 field goals made and set one with four 50-yarders (including a 54-yard field goal). He also finished as the NFC's second-leading kicker with 118 points and had a team record 39 attempts.

He was left unprotected in Plan B free agency after accepting a $25,000 dollars advance on his salary and agreeing verbally with the Cowboys that he would not sign with any other team. After the Tampa Bay Buccaneers lost Steve Christie in a similar situation, they targeted Willis as their replacement and convinced him to sign a two-year deal potentially worth more than $800,000 dollars (including a $100,000 signing bonus), leaving the Cowboys scrambling for a kicker.

Tampa Bay Buccaneers
In 1992, after struggling (8 of 14 field goals made) and missing 3 critical attempts during a 7 games span, he was replaced with Eddie Murray and released on November 10.

New York Giants
On November 21, 1992, he signed with the New York Giants to replace an injured Matt Bahr (sprained right knee). He played in 6 games and didn't miss a field goal or an extra point. The next year, he suffered a career-ending stress fracture in his left leg during training camp and was waived injured on July 27, 1993.

Personal life
Willis pursued a career in teaching after football. He is currently a math teacher at Bentonville High School and previously at Lafayette High School. He was also a middle school math teacher in the Owensboro Public School system.

References

External links
 Through These Halls: Willis recalls past career in NFL 

1966 births
Living people
Sportspeople from Owensboro, Kentucky
Players of American football from Kentucky
American football placekickers
Centre Colonels football players
Kentucky Wildcats football players
Dallas Cowboys players
New York Giants players
Tampa Bay Buccaneers players